Confederates is a novel by the Australian author Thomas Keneally which uses the American Civil War as its main subject matter.

Confederates uses the United States Civil War as a setting for a more personal conflict between neighbors. In the midst of the war's climactic battle—Antietam—another conflict is underway. Ephie Bumpass' husband Usaph and Ephie's lover Decatur Cate are thrown together to fight in the Shenandoah Volunteers. Cate's emasculating injury in the battle is a symbolic punishment for his sin.

Awards and nominations
 Booker Prize: shortlisted 1979

External links
 "The Sites of War in the Fiction of Thomas Keneally" by Peter Pierce, Australian Literary Studies vol.12 no.4 October 1986 (pp. 442–452)

References

Novels by Thomas Keneally
Novels set during the American Civil War
1979 Australian novels
William Collins, Sons books
Harper & Row books